Thaumastochilus termitomimus is a spider species of the family Zodariidae. Unlike other zodariid spiders, which mostly hunt and sometimes look like ants, T. termitomimus mimics termites.

Distribution
T. termitomimus occurs in South Africa.

References
 Jocqué R. (1994). A termite mimicking spider:  Thaumastochilus termitomimus n. sp.  (Araneae, Zodariidae). J. afr. Zool. 108:321-327.

Endemic fauna of South Africa
Zodariidae
Spiders of South Africa
Spiders described in 1994